Pleasant Hills may refer to:
 Pleasant Hills, New South Wales, Australia
 Pleasant Hills, Nova Scotia, Canada
 Pleasant Hills, Maryland, United States
 Pleasant Hills (Upper Marlboro, Maryland), a historic home
 Pleasant Hills, Ohio, United States
 Pleasant Hills, Pennsylvania, United States

See also
Pleasant Hill (disambiguation)